Prime Media Group Limited (formerly Prime Television Limited) was an Australian-based media corporation that formerly owned regional television network Prime7 in eastern Australia and GWN7 in regional Western Australia. It also owned ishop TV, a datacasting channel, co-owned by Brand Developers and two joint ventures with the WIN Corporation, Mildura Digital Television, and West Digital Television.

Prime Media Group head office and Australian Securities Exchange registered office was located in Watson, Canberra. A secondary corporate office was located at Jones Bay Wharf, Pyrmont, Sydney (which was also the Seven Network's head office).

Prime7 had sales offices located in each regional sub-market. There were also national regional sales offices at the Seven Network's metropolitan offices/studios in Sydney, Melbourne, Brisbane, Adelaide and Perth.

Prime7's national broadcast facility was located in Canberra, with playout facilities (as of 2021) shared with hybrid-funded broadcaster SBS Television at a facility operated by Telstra.

Prime Media Group Limited was renamed PRT Company Limited on 3 January 2022.

History

Foundation of Prime
Prime Television began life in 1970, when mineral explorer Altarama Minerals was incorporated and listed on the Australian Securities Exchange. Following its movement into the automotive industry, the business changed its name to Altarama in 1973.

Paul Ramsay gained control of Altarama in 1985, subsequently renaming it once again to Ramcorp. As part of a diversification into television, advertising, and healthcare, Ramcorp appointed Allan Hoy as founding media CEO who spearheaded the purchase of regional television stations RVN-2 Wagga Wagga, AMV-4 Albury, CWN-6 Dubbo, CBN-8 Orange, ECN-8 Taree and NEN-9 Tamworth in 1987. Soon after, the stations began to be known collectively as the Prime Television Network. In August 1991 Ramcorp was renamed Prime Television.

Aggregation and expansion
In the lead-up to television aggregation, Ramcorp signed a 10-year programming affiliation agreement with the Seven Network – the start of a close relationship between the two networks. In 1991 the business changed its name to Prime Television Limited, reflecting its new nature as a television broadcaster in regional Victoria and New South Wales.

Throughout the early 1990s, Ramcorp had incurred significant debts as a result of loans taken out throughout the 1980s in order to expand the company – Ramcorp's healthcare and media interests in Australia and the United States failed to turn a profit, resulting in falling share prices for the business. By 1993, Prime Television made a $7.4 million profit following accumulated losses of $47 million between 1989 and 1991, as well as a further $200 million expanding Prime Television's audience reach to 17 per cent, as part of aggregation.

Prime expanded into Western Australia when it purchased the Golden West Network from Seven Network owner Kerry Stokes in 1996. At the time, GWN was the monopoly commercial television network in the regional Western Australia license area, however WIN Television, Prime's competitor in parts of New South Wales and Victoria was granted a license by the Australian Broadcasting Authority a year later in 1997.

In the same year, Prime Television expanded internationally with the purchase of the Canal 9 television network in Argentina. Prime paid A$224 million for the network, later renamed Azul Televisión in 1999, before selling half of its share to local media group Torneos y Competencias for an undisclosed amount. Azul Televisión performed below expectations, largely due to a global economic crisis, and the Argentine network did not make a profit. Prime Television pulled out of Argentina in 2001, selling its stake for A$108 million.

The network expanded further into New Zealand, with Prime Television New Zealand on 30 August 1998. In 2002, Prime New Zealand entered into a joint venture with Australian company Publishing & Broadcasting Limited, owners of the Nine Network. Under the agreement, Prime Television was given access to Nine Network programs, expertise and money. In return, PBL was given the option to acquire 50% of Prime Television New Zealand in 2008. As a result, Prime Television New Zealand's ratings and profits increased significantly. Sky Television purchased Prime NZ for NZ$30 million in November 2005.

For the 2007 Australian federal election, Prime's online division iPrime launched Federalelection.com.au, produced from Prime Television's Canberra headquarters in partnership with Roy Morgan.

The Seven Network purchased 14.9% of Prime Media Group and rumours emerge of an increased stake. In 2009, Lachlan Murdoch purchased an 8% stake.

Acquisition by Seven West Media
Seven made two attempts to purchase Prime. In December 2019, its first acquisition attempt failed after Prime shareholders Bruce Gordon and Anthony Catalano voted down, despite majority of shareholders voting in favour of the transaction; on 1 November 2021, Seven made its second attempt for $121.9 million.
 On 23 December 2021, majority of Prime's shareholders voted in favour of the takeover which took effect on 31 December 2021.

Assets

Television
Prime7
GWN7
ishop TV
Mildura Digital Television (50% share with WIN Corporation)
West Digital Television (50% share with WIN Corporation)

iPrime
iPrime was an Australian internet portal produced by Prime Media Group. The portal was deployed across regions in which Prime7 and GWN7 currently broadcast television transmissions, which include the Australian Capital Territory, regional New South Wales, regional Victoria and regional Western Australia.

References

External links
Company website

Companies based in Canberra
Companies formerly listed on the Australian Securities Exchange
 
Seven Network
Defunct broadcasting companies of Australia
Television broadcasting companies of Australia
Australian companies established in 1986
Australian companies disestablished in 2021
Mass media companies established in 1986
Mass media companies disestablished in 2021
2021 mergers and acquisitions